Robin Schmidt (born 23 March 1965 in Hendrik-Ido-Ambacht) is a former Dutch professional footballer, notably for Sparta Rotterdam and FC Twente. He played both forward and midfield and scored in the 1984–85 UEFA Cup.

Career
Initially, he played in ASWH youth teams, then moved on to Sparta Rotterdam youth. 

From 1983 he played in Sparta Rotterdam's first squad. With Sparta, he competed for the UEFA Cup and on 18 September 1985 scored a goal in Sparta's 2–0 victory over Hamburger SV.

His soccer career next took him to FC Twente, FC Dordrecht, and the German club SuS Stadtlohn. 

Later, he occasionally played in senior teams of FC Twente.

References

1965 births
Living people
ASWH players
Sparta Rotterdam players
FC Twente players
FC Dordrecht players
Dutch footballers
Association football forwards
Footballers from Hendrik-Ido-Ambacht
SuS Stadtlohn players